The Botswana Division One, also known as the Second Division, is the third tier of professional football in Botswana. Although it is the poorest in terms of organisation and remuneration, it consists of more teams than both the Premier League and First Division.

League structure
For ease of fixture congestion and reduction of financial strain on economically struggling clubs, Division One is split into 17 regional leagues consisting of 6 to 17 teams. Each of these regional leagues is run by a localised football association under the overall management of the BFA and follows the Botswana football calendar from August to May. 
At the end of each campaign the 17 regional champions qualify for and contest the Botswana Division One playoffs. The winners of each block are then promoted to either the First Division North or South depending on their geographical location (the north and east blocks feed the First Division North whereas the south and west blocks feed the First Division South). Prior to this the four block winners had to compete in a secondary playoff which saw the number of promoted teams reduced to just two. However, that format was abandoned in 2015 after mass complaints by teams.

Current members
Zicustanz

References

Football competitions in Botswana
1966 establishments in Botswana
Football leagues in Botswana